The following lists events that happened during 1933 in New Zealand.

Population
 Estimated population as of 31 December 1933 – 1,547,100
 Increase since previous 31 December 1932 – 12,400 (0.81%)
 Males per 100 females – 103.4

Incumbents

Regal and viceregal
 Head of State – George V
 Governor-General – The Lord Bledisloe

Government
The 24th New Zealand Parliament continued with the coalition of the United Party and the Reform Party.
 Speaker of the House – Charles Statham (Independent)
 Prime Minister – George Forbes
 Minister of Finance – William Downie Stewart until 28 January, then Gordon Coates (Reform Party)
 Minister of Foreign Affairs – George Forbes
 Attorney-General – William Downie Stewart until 28 January, then George Forbes
 Chief Justice — Sir Michael Myers

Parliamentary opposition
 Leader of the Opposition — Harry Holland until his death on 8 October, succeeded 12 October by Michael Joseph Savage (Labour Party).

Judiciary
 Chief Justice — Sir Michael Myers

Main centre leaders
 Mayor of Auckland — George Hutchison
 Mayor of Wellington — Thomas Hislop
 Mayor of Christchurch — Dan Sullivan
 Mayor of Dunedin — Robert Black, then Edwin Thomas Cox

Events 
 26 January – Second session of the 24th Parliament commences.
 10 March – Parliament goes into recess.
 13 September – Elizabeth McCombs wins the Lyttelton by-election, becoming New Zealand's first female MP.
 21 September – Parliament recommences.
 22 December – Second session of the 24th Parliament concludes.
 New Zealand's first distinctive coins issued by the New Zealand Treasury, see New Zealand pound.

Arts and literature

See 1933 in art, 1933 in literature, :Category:1933 books

Music

See: 1933 in music

Radio

See: Public broadcasting in New Zealand

Film

See: :Category:1933 film awards, 1933 in film, List of New Zealand feature films, Cinema of New Zealand, :Category:1933 films

Sport

Chess
 The 42nd National Chess Championship are held in Auckland, and are won by M.E. Goldstein, of Sydney.

Golf
 The 23rd New Zealand Open championship is won by Ernie Moss in a playoff against Ted Douglas.
 The 37th National Amateur Championships are held at Titirangi
 Men – B.V. Wright (Otago)
 Women – Miss O. Kay (her second title)

Horse racing

Harness racing
 New Zealand Trotting Cup – Red Shadow
 Auckland Trotting Cup – Indianapolis

Thoroughbred racing
 New Zealand Cup – Palantua
 Avondale Gold Cup – King's Knave
 Auckland Cup – Minerval
 Wellington Cup – Royal Artist
 New Zealand Derby – Nightly

Lawn bowls
The national outdoor lawn bowls championships are held in Wellington.
 Men's singles champion – W.M. Parkhouse (Wellington Bowling Club)
 Men's pair champions – H.S. Maslin, M.J. Squire (skip) (Hawera Bowling Club)
 Men's fours champions – A.R. Hastings, R. McKenzie, J.M. Brackenridge, L.M. Naylor (skip) (Lyall Bay Bowling Club)

Rugby league
New Zealand national rugby league team

Rugby union
 The Ranfurly Shield is retained by  all season, with successful defences against:
 Ashburton County 31–7
  21–3
  8–5
  23–14
  13–3
  15–15
  6–3
  36–0

Soccer
 The New Zealand national football team tours Australia:
 20 May – Lose 0–5 vs New South Wales at Sydney
 24 May – Win 1–0 vs South Coast at Bulli
 27 May – Lose 1–7 vs Northern Districts at Newcastle
 1 June – Lose 4–5 vs Ipswich / West Moreton at Ipswich
 3 June – Win 5–1 vs Queensland at Brisbane
 5 June – Lose 2–4 vs Australia at Brisbane
 10 June – Draw 2–2 vs Australian XI at Newcastle
 13 June – Lose 0–1 vs South Maitland at Cessnock
 17 June – Lose 4–6 vs Australia at Sydney
 21 June – Lose 2–3 vs Metropolis at Sydney
 24 June – Lose 2–4 vs Australia at Sydney
 26 June – Win 4–2 vs Granville at Granville
 28 June – Lose 2–7 vs Gladesville-Ryde at Gladesville
 The Chatham Cup is won by Ponsonby who beat Millerton All Blacks 2–1 in the final.
 Provincial league champions:
 Auckland – Thistle
 Waikato – Rotowaro
 Taranaki – Albion
 Wanganui – Wanganui Athletic
 Hawke's Bay – Whakatu
 Wellington – Petone
 Nelson – Athletic
 Canterbury – Thistle
 Otago – Maori Hill
 Southland – Corinthians

Births

January
 2 January – Ian Axford, space scientist
 4 January – Desmond Digby, stage designer, book illustrator, painter
 5 January – Archie Currie, field hockey player
 9 January – John Morris, cricketer
 18 January – Frank McMullen, rugby union player and referee

February
 14 February
 John Beedell, canoeist
 Mildred Sampson, long-distance runner
 20 February – D. J. Cameron, journalist, sportswriter
 21 February – Warren Cooper, politician
 22 February – Alan Kirton, agricultural scientist

March
 7 March – Jay Epae, singer
 8 March – Ronnie Moore, speedway rider
 10 March – Patricia Bergquist, zoologist
 11 March – Merv Smith, broadcaster
 15 March – Ian McDonald, neurologist
 18 March – John Kynoch, sports shooter
 23 March – Helen Tippett, architect, academic
 24 March – Trevor de Cleene, politician
 26 March
 Ron Chippindale, aircraft accident investigator
 Henare te Ua, broadcaster
 31 March – John Butcher, mathematician

April
 1 April – Margaret Austin, politician
 2 April – Maunga Emery, rugby union and rugby league player
 5 April – Brian Elwood, lawyer, politician, public servant
 6 April – Gerard Francis Loft, Roman Catholic bishop
 10 April – Gay Eaton, textile artist
 11 April – Lance Payne, cyclist
 16 April – Bill Dillon, politician
 21 April
 Bob McDonald, lawn bowls player
 Cleone Rivett-Carnac, javelin thrower
 24 April – Rowley Habib, writer
 28 April – Tim Beaglehole, historian

May
 5 May – Colin Maiden, mechanical engineer, university administrator
 10 May – Barry Smith, evangelist
 15 May
 Michael Dean, television broadcaster
 Ronald Hemi, rugby union player, cricketer
 31 May – Peter Bromhead, cartoonist

June
 1 June – Ian Sinclair, cricketer
 8 June – Peter Lucas, rower
 13 June – Brian Johnston, field hockey player
 17 June – George Griffiths, journalist, historian, writer
 20 June – Duncan Laing, swimming coach
 21 June – Jack Fagan, rugby league player
 29 June – June Blackburn, long jumper

July
 4 July – Pam Williams, businesswoman, philanthropist
 7 July
 Murray Halberg, athlete, philanthropist
 Peter Gresham, politician
 9 July – Gordon Vette, airline pilot
 13 July – John Lithgow, politician
 15 July – Tom McNab, association footballer
 18 July – Kevin Ireland, writer
 20 July – David Donald, cricketer
 22 July – Robin M. Startup, philatelist
 27 July – Roger Harris, cricketer

August
 10 August – Paratene Matchitt, artist
 17 August – Jules Le Lievre, rugby union player
 21 August – Don McLaren, businessman, horseracing administrator
 25 August – Johnny Halafihi, professional boxer

September
 2 September – Patricia Prain, alpine skier
 4 September – Greg Aim, cricketer, sports and arts administrator
 5 September – George Petersen, biochemist
 17 September – Patrick O'Farrell, historian
 26 September – Malcolm Simpson, cyclist
 30 September – Niel Wright, writer

October
 8 October – Dick Haggie, rugby league player
 9 October – Alby Duckmanton, cricket player and administrator
 13 October – Philip Sherry, broadcaster, politician
 17 October – Trevor H. Howard-Hill, English literature academic
 18 October – Dave Crowe, cricketer
 21 October – Neil Ritchie, cyclist
 27 October – Earle Wells, sailor
 30 October – Col Campbell, gardening broadcaster
 31 October – John Buxton, rugby union player

November
 1 November – Denis Hanrahan, Roman Catholic bishop
 10 November – Don Clarke, rugby union player
 11 November – Pamela Barham, netball player and coach
 29 November – Wilf Malcolm, mathematician, university administrator

December
 10 December – Gren Alabaster, cricketer
 17 December
 Jeremy Commons, opera historian
 Bruce Morrison, cricketer
 18 December – Roger Sandall, anthropologist
 26 December – Keith Butler, cricketer
 27 December – Frank Rogers, politician

Exact date not given
 Peter Beadle, artist
 Eric Matthews, wrestler
 Tom McCabe, association footballer
 Keita Meretana, professional wrestler
 Noelene Swinton, high jumper

Deaths

January–March
 9 January – Frank Milne, mountaineer and guide (born 1891)
 16 January – John Burt, rugby union player, cricketer, businessman (born 1874)
 22 January – Henry Fletcher, Presbyterian missionary and minister (born 1868)
 25 January – Harry Kennedy, politician (born )
 5 February – Maria Mackay, nurse, midwife (born 1844)
 10 March – Ben Biddle, soldier (born 1843)
 19 March – Tommy Solomon, Moriori leader (born 1884)
 22 March – Ada Wells, feminist, social worker (born 1863)
 29 March
 Harold Thomas, boxer (born 1909)
 Hoani Paraone Tunuiarangi, Ngāti Kahungunu and Rangitāne leader (born )

April–June
 6 April – James Moore, cricketer (born 1877)
 7 April – Alfred Dunlop, tennis player (born 1875)
 9 April – Charles Monro, rugby union pioneer (born 1851)
 2 May – William Barker McEwan, librarian (born 1870)
 8 May – James Johnstone, businessman, stock breeder (born 1859)
 11 May – George Humphreys, rugby union player (born 1870)
 17 May – Emmet McHardy, Roman Catholic missionary (born 1904)
 20 May – Sir Thomas Sidey, politician (born 1863)
 10 June – Frank Cooke, lawyer and cricketer (born 1862)
 24 June – Heni Te Kiri Karamu, Te Arawa leader, warrior, interpreter (born 1840)
 27 June – Ernest Hayes, engineer, inventor (born 1851)

July–September
 6 July – John Court, businessman, politician, philanthropist (born 1846)
 10 July – Wiremu Rikihana, Te Rarawa leader, politician (born 1851)
 15 July
 Henry Hill, educationalist, politician, mayor of Napier (1917–19) (born 1849)
 David Theomin, merchant, philanthropist, collector (born 1852)
 26 July – Samuel Lawry, Methodist minister (born 1854)
 29 July – Sandy Paterson, rugby union player (born 1885)
 2 August – James McCombs, politician (born 1873)
 6 August – Hart Udy, rugby union player (born 1857)
 9 August – Hone Riiwi Toia, Ngāpuhi leader, prophet (born )
 12 August – Hugh Northcote, Anglican clergyman, writer on sex (born 1868)
 25 August – G. M. Thomson, scientist, politician (born 1848)
 31 August – Archibald McNicol, politician (born 1878)
 4 September – Joseph Kemp, Christian fundamentalist leader (born 1872)
 24 September – Raymond McIntyre, artist, art critic (born 1879)

October–December
 1 October
 Lord Ranfurly, governor of New Zealand (1897–1904) (born 1856)
 Te Rata Mahuta, fourth Māori King (1912–1933) (born )
 2 October – Anton Teutenberg, stonemason, carver, engraver, medallist, jeweller (born 1840)
 5 October – Samuel Hurst Seager, architect (born 1855)
 7 October – William Still Littlejohn, cricketer, schoolteacher (born 1859)
 8 October – Harry Holland, politician (born 1868)
 13 October – Mary McCarthy, temperance worker, political activist (born 1866)
 23 October – Bert Lowe, boxer (born 1912)
 27 October – Lancelot Hemus, cricketer (born 1881)
 28 October
 Harriet Heron, businesswoman (born )
 Charles Reade, town planner (born 1880)
 9 November – Pepene Eketone, interpreter, native agent, politician (born )
 16 November – John Lomas, trade unionist, public servant (born 1848)
 21 November – Samuel Manning, brewer, politician, mayor of Christchurch (1889–90) (born 1841)
 8 December – Thomas Kingsland, cricketer (born 1862)
 13 December – Calasanctius Howley, Roman Catholic nun, teacher (born 1848)

See also
 History of New Zealand
 List of years in New Zealand
 Military history of New Zealand
 Timeline of New Zealand history
 Timeline of New Zealand's links with Antarctica
 Timeline of the New Zealand environment

References

External links

 
Years of the 20th century in New Zealand